Sameehg Doutie (born 31 May 1989 in Cape Town, Western Cape) is a South African footballer who plays as a midfielder for Bidvest Wits in the South African premier division.

Career

Atlético de Kolkata

On 24 June 2015, it was announced that Sameehg Doutie signed an agreement with Atlético Madrid to play for their feeder club Atlético de Kolkata for the second season of the Indian Super League. The club is the ISL 2014 champions, and was managed by former Bolivia and Valencia manager Antonio López Habas. It was also announced that Atlético Madrid will look at his opportunities abroad and further his career abroad once his contract expires with Atlético de Kolkata.

In 2017, Atletico de Kolkata decided to release Doutie, after which he joined Jamshedpur FC.

References

1989 births
Living people
Sportspeople from Cape Town
South African people of Malay descent
South African soccer players
Cape Town Spurs F.C. players
Orlando Pirates F.C. players
SuperSport United F.C. players
ATK (football club) players
IFK Värnamo players
Superettan players
Association football midfielders
2011 CAF U-23 Championship players